Polonio Pass is a low mountain pass that separates the Temblor Range to the south, and the Diablo Range to the north, linking Kern County, California, in the Central Valley, to Shandon and Paso Robles in San Luis Obispo County, both in the American state of California. The pass is surrounded by grassy plains, with Highway 46 beginning its wind through the narrow mountain gap just a couple miles west. It is the southernmost crossing of the Diablo Range.

References

Mountain passes of California
Diablo Range
Landforms of Kern County, California
Transportation in Kern County, California